Thyrogonia cyaneotincta is a moth in the subfamily Arctiinae. It was described by George Hampson in 1918. It is found in Malawi.

References

Endemic fauna of Malawi
Moths described in 1918
Arctiinae